Simba Cement Uganda Limited (SCUL), also National Cement Company Uganda, is a cement manufacturer in Uganda. It is a subsidiary of National Cement Company Limited, the construction materials manufacturer based in Kenya. National Cement is itself a subsidiary of the Devki Group of Companies.

Location
The coordinates of the Simba Cement Uganda Limited Complex are: 0°44'05.0"N, 34°11'02.0"E (Latitude:0.734709; Longitude:34.183878).

Overview
The new cement factory has an installed production capacity of one million metric tonnes annually. It was developed at an estimated cost of US$185 million. Other credible sources have estimated cost at US$199 million. Commercial production started during the first half of 2018. Installed capacity production is 3,000 metric tonnes daily, which translates to about 800,000 metric tonnes annually.

Ownership
SCUL is a wholly owned subsidiary of National Cement Company Limited  (NCCL) based in Kenya. The shareholding in National Cement Kenya, the parent of Simba Cement Uganda Limited, is as illustrated in the table below:

Construction
The main contractor was Mepani Technical Services Limited. The construction of the factory (excluding equipment and systems), cost an estimated US$55 million, and took two and one half years. Official commissioning took place on 29 August 2018.

See also
List of cement manufacturers in Uganda

References

External links
New cement factory opens in Tororo As of 26 July 2017. (Video).
Uganda: Two New Cement Plants In Tororo By 2018

Cement companies of Uganda
Devki Group
Tororo District
Manufacturing companies established in 2017
2017 establishments in Uganda